Adam Joan is a 2017 Indian Malayalam-language action thriller film written and directed by Jinu V. Abraham, produced by Jairaj Motion Pictures and B Cinemas, distributed by Renji Panicker Entertainment. The film stars Prithviraj Sukumaran in the title role alongside an ensemble cast including Mishti, Narain, Rahul Madhav, Bhavana, Lena, Maniyanpilla Raju, Jaya Menon and Madhusudhan Rao. It was shot in Scotland and Kerala. Adam Joan was released in India on 1 September 2017 and was a major commercial success.

Plot
  
Adam Joan Pothen is a rich planter and businessman in Kerala who has a passion for farming. One day he meets a Jewish girl named Amy, who sings in a choir where they eventually fall in love and get married. Adam's brother Unni, Unni's  wife Swetha, and the brothers's mother are settled in Scotland. Adam and Amy visit them, where Amy conceives and is forced to stay there. While Adam returns to Kerala on plantation business, Amy dies of childbirth complications. Adam is overwhelmed and leaves his newborn daughter Ila with his brother and sister-in-law, who are childless. Adam believes that the pregnancy was the cause of his wife's death and never visits his daughter thereafter.

7 years later, a guilt-ridden Adam returns to Scotland when his mother is killed and Ila is kidnapped by unknown people. Adam starts an investigation along with his best friend Cyriac. After receiving information about children being kidnapped from Edinburgh, the duo learn of Satan worshipers, who sacrifice young Jewish girls or Christian missionaries to Satan on days such as Good Friday and Easter. When Satan is considered to be weak, they suspect the Satan Worshipers of kidnapping Ila as she is half-Jewish from her maternal side. Cyriac notes that Daisy, Swetha's friend was suspiciously messaging someone the day Ila was kidnapped and she hails from a family in Kerala which secretly worships dark forces called Karuthachan Ootu. 

They deduces that this might have something to do with Ila's kidnapping. Adam and Cyriac kidnap Daisy and interrogate her; she reveals being part of a satanic cult spread across the Scottish mainland. She also reveals having taken Swetha to their church where the latter prayed to have her own child and was declared pregnant after five months. The cult's high priest, Edward Williams, who is Daisy's and Swetha's professor at work too, had demanded that Swetha either has to dedicate her awaited baby to Satan, or surrender Ila for a Satanic ritual, both of which Swetha did not agree to. However, the cult's real target was Ila, whose identity was given by Daisy to Edward, who told them where to find Ila. 

Swetha knew about the kidnappers, believing that Ila will be returned after the ritual and deeply apologizes to Adam. Adam and Cyriac search Edward's house for more clues, finding a photograph with 12 Satanic priests. Adam then abducts Edward and tortures him to no avail, where he takes Edward back to his house. Adam gets rid of all of the evidence of his presence and kills him by throwing him off the stairs after force-feeding him with alcohol. Still on track of Ila, Adam goes to Edward's grave after his funeral, where he finds the other priests performing rituals on the grave. Adam learns of Nathan, a Sri Lankan Tamilian Satanic priest, one of the 12 priests in the photo whom he had actually seen once with Ila but could not catch. He follows Nathan, kidnaps his daughter and asks him to tell where Ila's location. 

Nathan reveals that Ila is going to be sacrificed within two days in a ceremony on Good Friday, which will be attended by all the satanic priests, including himself. Adam, who had earlier arranged Cyriac for safely returning Nathan's daughter unconditionally is taken to the ceremonial venue by Nathan, who reminds him that the new high priest, Dr. Steve is a ruthless and brilliant man, who will sense any danger. Adam is introduced to Steve as George Augustine, a satanic priest from India. As prayers for Ila's sacrifice starts, Steve blows Adam's cover, but is disrupted by Nathan, who does not know that his daughter is safe, telling Steve that the daughter's life is in Adam's hands. Steve tries to contact her, but Cyriac warns Steve on the phone that Adam and Ila should better return unharmed or else he will kill Nathan's daughter. 

Adam falls unconscious after being knocked, and an enraged Nathan charges towards Steve, not willing to wait anymore for the ritual to begin, but is almost killed by the other priests. Waking up to save his daughter, Adam kills all of the priests, but is stabbed by Steve. However, Adam overpowers and kills him. Nathan succumbs to his injuries while Adam rescues Ila and leaves but succumbs to his own injuries en route. At the graves of Adam, Amy, and the mother. Cyriac asks Ila about Adam, to which she responds that he was her father's brother. Unni and Shweta decide to tell Ila the real facts when she is old enough and will come with better flowers when she learns the truth about her parents.

Cast

 Prithviraj Sukumaran as Adam Joan (pron. "John") Pothen 
 Mishti as Amy Adam John Pothen
 Narain as Cyriac 
 Rahul Madhav as Unni Pothen 
 Bhavana as Swetha Unni Pothen
 Lena as Daisy
 Madhusudhan Rao as Nathan 
 Jaya Menon as Nirmala Pothen
 Maniyanpilla Raju as Andrews
 K. P. A. C. Lalitha as Cyriac's mother
 Mark Strange as Dr. Steve
 Christopher John Bridgett as Edward Williams
 Grant Manson McGregor as John (Satanic Priest)
 Benny Bereal as Michael (Satanic Priest)
 Gerard Wilkie as Satanist
 Sidhartha Siva as Ajai 
 Shine M. Tom as Philip
 Megha Mathew as Niya
 Lintu Rony as Parishioner
 Juliet Watt as Julia
 Pamela Hanson as Police Constable
 Rufus Allan as Professor
 Begonia Villalba as Police Detective
 Danny Darren as David William

Production
Adam Joan marks the directorial debut of Jinu V. Abraham. Prithviraj Sukumaran plays the lead character of Adam John Pothen, a rich planter.  Bollywood actress Mishti is making her debut into the Malayalam film industry through this film, while Narain plays the role of Adam's friend Cyriac. The film will have two female protagonists; Bhavana plays one of them. Predominantly filmed in Scotland, the film also has portions shot at Kochi, Kottayam, Mundakkayam, and Thumpamon.

The movie is produced by B Cinemas & Jairaj Motion Pictures, which includes Brijeesh Mohamed, Josemon Simon, Umesh Unnikrishnan (Umesh Nair), and Nihal.

The movie is distributed by Renji Panicker Entertainment

Music
Gopi Sunder composed the film score. The songs were composed by Deepak Dev with lyrics penned by Santhosh Varma, B. K. Harinarayanan, Gilu Joseph, and Sri. C. P. Chandy.

Track listing
 "Arikil Ini Njaan Varaam" - Prithviraj Sukumaran
 "Eden Thottam" - Karthika
 "Ee Kaattu" - Karthik, Chorus

Release 

Adam Joan was one of the Onam releases of 2017. It initially released on 1 September 2017 in the US and a week later in Kerala and GCC.

Box office  
The film grossed 1.10 crore in the opening day at the Kerala box office. It collected 17.5 crore from Kerala box office.

References

External links
 

2017 films
Indian thriller films
Films about Satanism
Films about kidnapping
2017 directorial debut films
2010s Malayalam-language films
2017 thriller films
Films set in Scotland
Films shot in Scotland
Films about Jews and Judaism
Films about Christianity